Sunnyside is a building in Luss, Argyll and Bute, Scotland. It is a Category B listed structure dating to the mid 19th century.

The building, a single-storey cottage located on Pier Road, is made of whinstone and sandstone rubble with pink sandstone margins and dressings. It possesses timber diamond-paned casement windows and octagonal ridge chimney stacks with octagonal cans. It is a variant of the common form of cottage found elsewhere on the street.

The building is shown on the first-edition Ordnance Survey map, surveyed in 1864.

Gallery

See also
List of listed buildings in Luss, Argyll and Bute

References

External links
View of the building – Google Street View, April 2011

19th-century establishments in Scotland
Listed buildings in Luss, Argyll and Bute
Category B listed buildings in Argyll and Bute